Eric Camilli (born 6 September 1987) is a French rally driver. He has competed in the World Rally Championship since 2014. After starting out in the lower levels, he made his debut in the top level in 2016 while driving for M-Sport in a Ford Fiesta RS WRC.

Rally career
Camilli signed for Malcolm Wilson's M-Sport ahead of the 2016 season, after a season in WRC-2. His best result of the season was fifth place which he achieved at the 2016 Rally de Portugal. He finished the season in eleventh place with 28 points.

After M-Sport signed fellow frenchman and reigning champion Sébastien Ogier at the end of 2016 to tackle the 2017 season, Camilli was demoted to drive in WRC-2 with M-Sport for the year. He won the WRC-2 class in Germany and finished the campaign in second place. Camilli was retained by M-Sport in the WRC-2 for 2018.

Camilli drove the Volkswagen Polo GTI R5 on its debut in a one-off appearance with Volkswagen Motorsport at the 2018 Rally Catalunya. He continued to run with the Polo as an independent in season 2019.

Results

WRC results
 
* Season still in progress.

WRC-2 results

WRC-2 Pro results

WRC-3 results

* Season still in progress.

JWRC results

ERC results

References

External links

 rally results profile

Living people
1987 births
French rally drivers
World Rally Championship drivers
Place of birth missing (living people)
Saintéloc Racing drivers
M-Sport drivers